Siane (Siani) is a Papuan language spoken in the eastern highlands of Papua New Guinea. It is spoken in Siane Rural LLG and other neighboring local-level government areas of Papua New Guinea.

Named dialects are Hakoa, Kolepa, Yamofowe, Komongu, Komoigaleka, Kemanimowe, Ona, Keto, Laiya, Fowe, Olumba, Lambau, Alango, Yandime, Wando. Komongu and Lambau are the literary standards.

Like many Papuan languages Siane has a register tone system.

References

Kainantu–Goroka languages
Tonal languages
Languages of Eastern Highlands Province
Languages of Simbu Province